Samuel Carpenter was an American politician. He served as the second mayor of Lancaster, Pennsylvania, from 1821 to 1823.

References

Mayors of Lancaster, Pennsylvania